Shavkatdzhon Shokirovich Rakhimov (born 14 August 1994) is a Tajikistani professional boxer. He is the current IBF Super-featherweight champion, having held the title since November 2022. He previously held the IBO super-featherweight title from 2017 to 2019 and challenged for the IBF super-featherweight title in February 2021. As of June 2020, he is ranked as the world's sixth best active super-featherweight by the Transnational Boxing Rankings Board, seventh by BoxRec and ninth by The Ring.

Amateur career
In 2013, Rakhimov won a gold medal at the Tajikistan National Championships in Dushanbe in June, and went on to compete at the 2013 World Boxing Championships in Almaty, Kazakhstan in October where he defeated Adilson Justino of Angola and Branimir Stankovic of Serbia but lost to Ermek Sakenov of Kyrgyzstan in the third round.

In 2014, Rakhimov won a gold medal at the Tajikistan National Championships in Khujand in May, and went on to win a bronze medal at the 2014 World University Boxing Championships in Yakutsk, Russia in September. 

In 2015, Rakhimov won a gold medal at the 2015 Tajikistan National Championship in Dushanbe in March.

Professional career
Shavkat Rakhimov made his professional debut in 2015 at the age of 21. He won the WBO Inter-Continental Youth super featherweight title in 2016, and by mid 2017 had amassed a record of 10 wins with all but two by stoppage.

On 20 June 2017, it was announced that Rakhimov would face off against David Saucedo on 9 September in Chelyabinsk, Russia for the vacant IBO world title, last held by Malcolm Klassen who was stripped in May due to inactivity. However, on 18 August, RCC Boxing announced that Saucedo had pulled out of the fight notifying the promoter that he would be unable to make the weight. He was replaced by Emanuel Lopez. On 9 September, Rakhimov defeated Emanuel Lopez by unanimous decision to win the IBO super featherweight title.

On 10 February 2018, Rakhimov defeated former IBF and IBO champion Malcolm Klassen to retain the IBO super featherweight title. He won the bout by technical knockout in the eighth round.

On 19 August, Rakhimov defended his title against Mexican boxer Robinson Castellanos, who had a recent victory over Yuriorkis Gamboa and had previously challenged for the WBA (Super) and interim WBC titles in 2017 and 2016, respectively. Rakhimov won the bout by technical knockout at 1:36 of the second round. 

On 23 March 2019, Rakhimov defeated South African boxer Rofhiwa Maemu by knockout in the fourth round.
Maemu suffered two knockdowns in the round after which he walked back to his corner signaling an end to the fight.

Professional boxing record

See also
List of world super-featherweight boxing champions

References

External links

|-

|-

1994 births
Living people
Tajikistani male boxers
International Boxing Organization champions
International Boxing Federation champions
World super-featherweight boxing champions
Lightweight boxers
People from Khatlon Region